Shaaban Abdel Rahim, also known as Sha'bola, (15 March 1957 – 3 December 2019) was an Egyptian pop (Sha'abi) singer, formerly working as makwagi (man who irons clothing) and known for catchy songs with political lyrics.

Introduction
Sha'bān Abdel Rahīm was born in Cairo, Egypt and worked for many years in poverty as a foot-operated laundry presser before his songs catapulted him into stardom. Following a string of sensationalist hits, Abdel Rahīm became one of the most popular Egyptian sha'bī singers. Egyptian Sha'bī is a category of popular class music that can be described as urbanized folk music.

In 2000, Sha'bān's breakthrough song "Ana Bakrah Israel" (I Hate Israel) accompanied by the catchy refrain "But I Love Amr Moussa", caused a great deal of controversy, and many were surprised that it passed Egyptian censors. Many of Shaaban's songs were sold informally on cheaply processed cassette tapes. His poor background, informal language, and frank lyrics have made him very popular with the Egyptian public.

Since then, Sha'bān has continued to produce popular political songs, often quickly following current events. After the September 11, 2001 attacks, he produced a song titled "Yā 'Amm 'Arabī" (Literally: "Oh Arab People," meaning "Hey Arabs"). His song "Bin Bin Bin Bin Laden" was on the Egyptian airwaves before startled state censors banned it. He got back at the top of the Arab hit parade with "The Attack on Iraq" / "Don't Bomb Iraq". The hit could be heard from taxis in downtown Cairo streets:Enough!
Chechnya! Afghanistan! Palestine! Southern Lebanon! Golan Heights!
And now Iraq, too? And now Iraq, too?
It's too much for people! Shame on you!
Enough! Enough! Enough!
In 2005, he produced a song about the Muhammed cartoon controversy entitled "We’re All Out of Patience", and in 2006 a song about the 2006 Israeli-Lebanon conflict. During 2010 Ramadan season, an episode with  Sha'bān, in Ibrahim Issa's Hamra (Red) television talk show, was focusing on defending the right to smoke hashish.

Islām Khalīl, the songwriter and  an Arabic teacher at an elementary school in Qalyubia responsible for "I hate Israel", "Bombing Iraq" and other politically contentious songs sung by the performer, said he had to teach Abdel Rahīm the meaning behind some of the ideas behind his songs.

Death
Abdel Rahim died on 3 December 2019 at the age of 62 in Cairo due to heart failure.

References

External links
Shaaban Abdel Rahim: All of our patience has run out (Youtube)
Shaaban Abdel Rahim: Just for two soldiers (Youtube)
Shaaban Abdel Rahim: Saddam Hussein (Youtube)
Arabic Song Lyrics and Translation - Shaaban Abdel Rehim: We've Lost All Patience

1957 births
2019 deaths
21st-century Egyptian male singers
Musicians from Cairo